Iceland competed at the 2016 Winter Youth Olympics in Lillehammer, Norway from 12 to 21 February 2016.

Alpine skiing

Boys

Girls

Cross-country skiing

Boys

See also
Iceland at the 2016 Summer Olympics

References

2016 in Icelandic sport
Nations at the 2016 Winter Youth Olympics
Iceland at the Youth Olympics